Dmytro Shapoval (born 17 June 1996) is a professional Ukrainian football striker who played for FC Vorskla Poltava in the Ukrainian Premier League.

Career
Shapoval is a product of Horpynko Poltava youth sportive system.

He spent his career in FC Karlivka in the Ukrainian Second League and in the Ukrainian Premier League Reserves club FC Vorskla Poltava. And in summer 2016 Shapoval was promoted to the main-squad team of the FC Vorskla in the Ukrainian Premier League. He made his debut for Vorskla Poltava in the Ukrainian Premier League in a match against FC Volyn Lutsk on 10 December 2016.

References

External links 
 Profile on FFU site 
 

1996 births
Living people
Ukrainian footballers
Association football forwards
FC Karlivka players
Ukrainian Premier League players
FC Vorskla Poltava players